The Constitution of the Soviet Union recognised the Presidium of the Supreme Soviet and the earlier Central Executive Committee (CEC) of the Congress of Soviets as the highest organs of state authority in the Union of Soviet Socialist Republics (USSR) between legislative sessions. Under the 1924, 1936 and 1977 Soviet Constitutions these bodies served as the collective head of state of the Soviet Union. The Chairman of these bodies personally performed the largely ceremonial functions assigned to a single head of state but was provided little real power by the constitution.

The Soviet Union was established in 1922. However, the country's first constitution was only adopted in 1924. Before that time, the 1918 Constitution of the Russian Soviet Federative Socialist Republic functioned as the constitution of the USSR. According to the 1918 Constitution, the All-Russian Central Executive Committee (CEC), whose chairman was head of state, had the power to determine what matters of income and taxation would go to the state budget and what would go to the local soviets. The CEC could also limit taxes. In periods between convocations of the Congress of Soviets the CEC held supreme power. In between sessions of the Congress of Soviets the CEC was responsible for all the affairs of the Congress of Soviets. The CEC and the Congress of Soviets was replaced by the Presidium and the Supreme Soviet respectively by several amendments to the 1936 Constitution in 1938.

Under the 1977 Constitution, the Supreme Soviet was the highest organ of state power and the sole organ in the country to hold legislative authority. Sessions of the Supreme Soviet were convened by the Presidium twice a year; however, special sessions could be convened on the orders of a Union Republic. In the event of a disagreement between the Soviet of the Union and the Soviet of Nationalities the Presidium could form a conciliation commission. If this commission failed, the Presidium could dissolve the Supreme Soviet and order new elections. The Chairman of the Presidium of the Supreme Soviet, along with the first and fifteen other vice chairmen, would be elected by the deputies of the Supreme Soviet. In practice, the Chairman of the Presidium held little influence over policy ever since the delegation of the office's power to the General Secretary of the Communist Party of the Soviet Union (CPSU) during Joseph Stalin's rule.

The Presidency was established in 1990 and the President would, according to the altered constitution, be elected by the Soviet people by direct and secret ballot. However, the first and only Soviet President, Mikhail Gorbachev, was elected by the democratically elected Congress of People's Deputies. In connection with the dissolution of the Soviet Union national elections for the office of President never took place. To be elected to the office a person must have been a Soviet citizen and older than thirty-five but younger than sixty-five years. The same person could not be elected president more than twice. The Presidency was the highest state office, and was the most important office in the Soviet Union by influence and recognition, eclipsing that of Premier (later renamed to Prime Minister) and General Secretary. With the establishment of the Presidency executive power was shared between the President and the Prime Minister. The President was given broad powers, such as being responsible for negotiating the membership of the Cabinet of Ministers with the Supreme Soviet; the Prime Minister, however, was responsible for managing the nomenklatura and economic matters.

List of Presidents
Of the eleven individuals appointed head of state, three died in office of natural causes (Leonid Brezhnev, Yuri Andropov and Konstantin Chernenko), one held the position in a temporary role (Vasili Kuznetsov), and four held posts of party leader and head of state simultaneously (Brezhnev, Andropov, Chernenko and Mikhail Gorbachev). The first head of state was Mikhail Kalinin, who was inaugurated in 1922 after the Treaty on the Creation of the USSR. At over twenty years, Kalinin spent the longest time in office; he died shortly after his resignation in 1946. Andropov spent the shortest time in office.

Heads of the Russian Soviet Republic (1917–1922)

Heads of the Soviet Union (1922–1991)

List of Vice Presidents
There have been four individuals appointed vice head of state. At over eight years, Vasily Kuznetsov spent the longest time in office. Gennady Yanayev spent the shortest time in office.

See also 
Soviet Union-related

 Presidium of the Supreme Soviet
 Supreme Soviet of the Soviet Union
 List of leaders of the Soviet Union
 Premier of the Soviet Union
 List of governments of the Soviet Union
 List of spouses of the heads of state of the Soviet Union
 General Secretary of the Communist Party of the Soviet Union
Russia-related
 List of leaders of the Russian SFSR
 List of heads of government of Russia
 List of presidents of the Russian Federation

Notes

References 

Heads of state
Heads of state
 
Head of State
Soviet Union